Aleksandar Knežević (born 26 December 1968) is a Serbian former handball player and current coach.

Club career
Over the course of his career that spanned more than two decades, Knežević played for Borac Banja Luka, Crvena zvezda (1992–1993), USM Gagny (1993–1994), Conquense (1994–1995), Partizan (1995–1996 and 1998–1999), BSV Borba Luzern (1996–1998) and Frisch Auf Göppingen (1999–2007).

International career
Knežević represented FR Yugoslavia in the 2000 Summer Olympics. He was also a member of the team that won the bronze medal at the 1996 European Championship.

Honours
Borac Banja Luka
 Yugoslav Handball Cup: 1991–92
 EHF Cup: 1990–91
Partizan
 Handball Championship of FR Yugoslavia: 1998–99

References

External links
 Olympic record
 
 

1968 births
Living people
Sportspeople from Banja Luka
Serbs of Bosnia and Herzegovina
Serbian male handball players
Yugoslav male handball players
Competitors at the 1991 Mediterranean Games
Mediterranean Games medalists in handball
Mediterranean Games gold medalists for Yugoslavia
Olympic handball players of Yugoslavia
Handball players at the 2000 Summer Olympics
RK Borac Banja Luka players
RK Crvena zvezda players
RK Partizan players
Frisch Auf Göppingen players
Liga ASOBAL players
Handball-Bundesliga players
Expatriate handball players
Serbia and Montenegro expatriate sportspeople in France
Serbia and Montenegro expatriate sportspeople in Spain
Serbia and Montenegro expatriate sportspeople in Switzerland
Serbia and Montenegro expatriate sportspeople in Germany
Serbian handball coaches
Competitors at the 1990 Goodwill Games
Goodwill Games medalists in handball